Capital Hill Residence is a villa located on the north-face hillside of Barvikha, a town west of Moscow.

History
It was designed by British architect Zaha Hadid and Patrik Schumacher of Zaha Hadid Architects for property developer Vladislav Doronin. Construction on the project began in 2006 and it is the only private house that Hadid built during her lifetime. The house was completed in a futuristic style with an area of 2,650 square meters with four floors. Estimated to have cost $140 million, it is one of the most expensive, luxurious and unusual residences in the world.

See also
Neofuturism

References

External links
 Zaha Hadid
 Capital Hill Residence

 
Zaha Hadid buildings
Buildings and structures in Moscow Oblast
Odintsovsky District